Ruth Shalit Barrett (born 1971) is an American freelance writer and journalist whose work has appeared in The New Republic, The Wall Street Journal, ELLE, New York Magazine and The Atlantic.

In 1999 she resigned from The New Republic following claims of plagiarism and inaccuracy. In 2020, The Atlantic retracted an article she wrote for them after it emerged that she had lied to the magazine's fact-checking department.

Shalit Barrett graduated from Princeton University in 1992 and had her journalistic debut with Reason that same year. Soon after, she was offered an internship at The New Republic. Shalit was considered to be an up-and-coming young journalist throughout the 1990s after she was promoted to an associate editor position at The New Republic, writing cover stories for the political weekly. She also wrote for the New York Times Magazine and had a $45,000-a-year contract to do pieces for GQ.

She is the sister of conservative writer and author Wendy Shalit. She married Henry Robertson Barrett IV in 2004, becoming the stepdaughter-in-law of Edward Klein. Robertson Barrett was the Vice President of Media Strategy and Operations at Yahoo! before becoming the president of Hearst's digital division in 2016.

As of 2020, Shalit lives in Westport, Connecticut, with her husband and two children.

Plagiarism and inaccuracies

New Republic
In 1994 and 1995, Shalit was discovered to have plagiarized portions of several articles she wrote for New Republic.

In the fall of 1995, Shalit wrote a 13,000-word piece about race relations at The Washington Post. Shalit later admitted to "major errors" in the article, such as an assertion that a Washington, D.C., contractor who had never been indicted had served a prison sentence for corruption; misquoting a number of staffers; and numerous factual errors, such as mistakenly claiming that certain jobs at The Post were reserved for Black employees.

She left the New Republic in January 1999.

The Atlantic
In 2020, The Atlantic assigned and published an article Shalit wrote as a freelancer, "The Mad, Mad World of Niche Sports Among Ivy League–Obsessed Parents".  The article, published online in October 2020 and in its November 2020 print issue, exposed efforts of the affluent residents of the Gold Coast of Connecticut to use niche sports to give their already-privileged children further advantages in the competitive admissions process at elite colleges and universities. After questions were raised by The Washington Post's media critic, Erik Wemple, the magazine appended several corrections along with a lengthy editor's note to the online version. Ultimately, on November 1, 2020; The Atlantic retracted the entire article, but uploaded a PDF of the article's print version for the sake of "the historical record."

According to the note, it had emerged after the article was published both in print and online that Barrett had not only lied to Atlantic fact-checkers and editors, but encouraged at least one source to lie about having a son–all of which left no remedy short of a full retraction. The note also revealed that Barrett requested her byline read "Ruth S. Barrett," but that "in the interest of transparency," her maiden name was now spelled out in the byline. The Atlantic added that it had given Shalit this story in the belief that her past work in reputable publications merited a second chance after the plagiarism scandals of two decades earlier. However, the editors now realized that they were "wrong to make this assignment" that "reflects poor judgment on our part."

On January 7, 2022, Shalit sued The Atlantic and Don Peck (the Atlantic print editor at the time of the retraction) in federal court for $1 million in damages, arguing that her reputation had been "unlawfully smeared" by the retraction and accompanying editor's note. The Atlantic stood by both and rejected her allegations, describing the lawsuit as "meritless."

See also
 Claas Relotius
 Jayson Blair
 Stephen Glass
 Journalism scandals
 Schön scandal
 Fake news

References

External links 
 
 
 
 
 

American women journalists
1971 births
Journalistic hoaxes
Living people
The New Republic people
People involved in plagiarism controversies
Princeton University alumni
Writers from Milwaukee
Journalists from Wisconsin
20th-century American journalists
20th-century American women writers
21st-century American journalists
21st-century American women writers